Arnett is an unincorporated community in Harmon County, Oklahoma, United States. It is located five miles northwest of Hollis. A rural school was located in Arnett on Route 2. The school, along with Harmon County's other rural schools, was annexed into the Hollis school district.

References

Unincorporated communities in Harmon County, Oklahoma
Unincorporated communities in Oklahoma